The 2007 Canoe Slalom World Cup was a series of four races in 4 canoeing and kayaking categories organized by the International Canoe Federation (ICF). It was the 20th edition. The series consisted of Pan American continental championships which were open to all countries and 3 world cup races.

Calendar

Final standings 

The winner of each race was awarded 50 points. Paddlers outside the top 20 in the C2 event and outside the top 40 in the other 3 events were awarded 2 points for participation. If two or more athletes or boats were equal on points, the ranking was determined by their positions in the final world cup race.

Results

2007 Pan American Championships 

The 2007 Pan American Championships were held in Foz do Iguaçu, Brazil on March 16–18. Czech Republic was the most successful country taking home 2 golds and 1 bronze.

World Cup Race 1 

Prague, Czech Republic hosted the first regular world cup race of the season from June 29 to July 1. Czech paddlers took full advantage of the home water by winning 3 golds, a silver and a bronze.

World Cup Race 2 

The penultimate race took place in Tacen, Slovenia on July 7–8. Slovakia won the medal table with 2 golds and a silver while the home Slovenian paddlers captured 1 gold and 1 silver.

World Cup Race 3 

The series concluded with the race in Augsburg, Germany on July 13–15. Germany topped the medal table with 3 golds and 2 silvers.

References

External links 
International Canoe Federation

Canoe Slalom World Cup
Canoe Slalom World Cup